Peter Dickinson (1927–2015) was a British author 

Peter Dickinson may also refer to:

Peter Dickinson (musician) (born 1934), British composer
Peter Dickinson (architect) (1925–1961), Canadian architect